Louise Goff Reece (November 6, 1898 – May 14, 1970) was an American politician and a United States representative from Tennessee.

Early life
Born in Milwaukee, Wisconsin, Reece was a daughter of Guy D. Goff and granddaughter of Nathan Goff, both of whom were U.S. Senators from West Virginia. She was educated at Miss Treat's School, Milwaukee-Downer Seminary, and Miss Spence's School in New York City.

Career
During the long service of her husband, Representative Brazilla Carroll Reece, she regularly campaigned with him, serving as his chauffeur since he didn't drive. She became as well known as her husband.

Reece was elected as a Republican to the Eighty-seventh Congress to fill the vacancy when her husband died. She served from May 16, 1961 until January 3, 1963.  She was not a candidate for renomination in 1962 to the Eighty-eighth Congress.

Remaining active in State and national politics, Reece was a businesswoman with wide interests in Tennessee and West Virginia. She was a member of the board of the First Peoples Bank, Johnson City, Tennessee and chairman of the board of Carter County Bank, Elizabethton, Tennessee. She was also proprietor and manager of Goff Properties in Clarksburg, West Virginia.

Death
Reece died in Johnson City, Tennessee on May 14, 1970 (age 71 years, 189 days). She is interred at Monte Vista Memorial Park.

See also
 Women in the United States House of Representatives

References

External links

 

1898 births
1970 deaths
Politicians from Milwaukee
American bankers
Female members of the United States House of Representatives
Burials in Tennessee
Women in Tennessee politics
American women bankers
Republican Party members of the United States House of Representatives from Tennessee
20th-century American politicians
20th-century American women politicians
Spence School alumni